Tourism in the Central African Republic'  has been negatively affected by its recent troubled history and fighting in neighbouring countries. Security in the country is unstable, particularly in its north and northwest.

The US Department of State has a travel advisory in place discouraging travel to CAR for US citizens due to the risk of civil unrest and violent crime. In April 2007, a hunting party near Ndele town was attacked and a French hunter was killed and three others were injured.

The Central African Republic is a landlocked country, and a lack of air access makes it an expensive destination. The only international airport is Bangui M'poko International Airport. Locations in the country attractive to travelers include the Chutes De Boali, waterfalls of a height of 50 m (164 ft).

Dzanga-Sangha National Park in the southwest of the country has gorillas and elephants. The Baka people live in this area. Bayanga beside the Sangha River is the main village near to the national park. The village has some small guesthouses and a lodge. The best time to visit most of the country is from November to April.

References 

 
Central African Republic